2009: Lost Memories (2009 Loseutumemorijeu) is a 2002 South Korean science fiction action film directed by Lee Si-myung, adapted from the 1987 novel Looking for an Epitaph by Bok Geo-il. The film takes place in an alternate 2009, where the Korean Peninsula is still part of Imperial Japan due to a time-travel incident in 1909. It was distributed by CJ Entertainment and was released on February 1, 2002.

Background
The film's opening sequence shows the following timeline, which is an alternate history from the events that actually occurred:
 1909: An Jung-geun's assassination attempt against Itō Hirobumi is thwarted by a man named Inoue.
 1910: The Empire of Japan annexes the Korean Peninsula.
 1919: The March 1st Movement protests are suppressed with violence.
 1921: Inoue, Itō's savior, becomes Choseon's (Korea's) second governor-general.
 1932: The assassination of Yoshinori Shirakawa by Yoon Bong-gil is prevented.
 1936: The United States and the Empire of Japan enter World War II as allies against Nazi Germany.
 1943: Japan annexes Manchukuo.
 1945: Atomic bombs are dropped on Berlin instead of Hiroshima and Nagasaki, ending World War II.
 1960: Japan becomes a permanent member of the U.N. Security Council.
 1965: Japan launches its first satellite, Sakura 1 (presumably as part of the Space Race).
 1988: The 1988 Summer Olympics are held in Nagoya (in contrast to the city losing to Seoul in the actual timeline)
 2002: The 2002 FIFA World Cup is held in Japan (instead of both South Korea and Japan)

Plot
In 2009, the Korean Peninsula (Chosun) is still under Imperial Japanese rule and Japanese Bureau of Investigation (JBI) agents Masayuki Sakamoto and Shojiro Saigo thwart a hostage crisis at a museum in Keijo by a terrorist group known as the Hureisenjin. The exact motivation for the hostage situation is unknown, but during the investigation, Sakamoto discovers a museum artifact, a crescent-shaped rock known as the "Lunar Soul", found by one of the slain terrorists. After discovering that the Hureisenjin has a long history of targeting the Inoue Foundation, a group founded around the artifacts collected by the second Governor-General of Korea, Sakamoto begins to suspect the Hureisenjin were attempting to steal the Lunar Soul, although both he and Saigo are puzzled as to why a terrorist group would put so much effort into stealing historical artifacts. The Hureisenjin ambush the convoy shipping the foundation's artifacts back to Japan and take the Lunar Soul. The terrorists confront Sakamoto and Saigo in a gunfight, where Sakamoto encounters Oh Hye-rin, the organization's leader.

Sakamoto's questioning and accusations against the influential Inoue Foundation lead to him being thrown off the case, with the execution of Sakamoto's father as a traitor for aiding in a thwarted attack by the Hurisenjin on a cargo ship in Vladivostok in 1985 being cited by his suspicious superiors. Sakamoto pursues the investigation, traveling to Harbin to learn more about the Lunar Soul, and is then suspended from the JBI. That night, an unknown assailant murders Sakamoto's mentor, Takahashi, at his apartment and he is arrested for the crime. Sakamoto, however, escapes from the JBI with the help of Saigo, who vows to be his enemy the next time they meet.

A wounded Sakamoto stumbles into the Hureisenjin's hideout and Saigo is visited by the head of the Inoue Foundation, with both learning the truth: that they are living in an alternate timeline. In 2009, a large stone temple uncovered by a joint Chinese-Korean-Japanese archaeological expedition, is found to facilitate time travel, and through its exploitation by the Japanese right-wing nationalist group Uyoku dantai, a man named Inoue travels back in time exactly 100 years and prevents the assassination of Resident-General Itō Hirobumi on October 26, 1909. Itō's survival and Inoue's knowledge of future events allows for Japan, instead of being defeated with the other Axis Powers in World War II, to instead ally with the United States against Nazi Germany; The war ends in 1945, following the atomic bombing of Berlin (instead of Hiroshima and Nagasaki). As one of the victorious powers, Japan becomes a military and economic superpower with a permanent seat on the U.N. Security Council, with its colonial empire intact. Inoue goes on to become the second Governor-General of Korea and his descendants found the Inoue Foundation, which keeps knowledge of the altered timeline limited to only the highest levels of Japan's government. However, a Korean researcher who followed Inoue and attempted to stop him becomes the founder of Hureisenjin and passes along the story of the truth of the altered timeline, with the hope that the original timeline can somehow be restored.

Knowing about the altered history, Sakamoto allies with the Hureisenjin, who have located the temple stone and are planning their final attack. However, the JBI raid their hideout and kill almost everyone before being wiped out by an improvised explosive. Carrying the Lunar Soul with them, Sakamoto and Hye-rin escape to a tanker ship where the Inoue Foundation's artifacts are being held. They find the temple stone and place the Lunar Soul in it, which activates in the middle of a gunfight with the JBI. Hye-rin is killed, leaving Sakamoto as the only person left to fix the timeline. Sakamoto sends himself to Harbin in 1909, but is pursued by Saigo, who wants to retain the current timeline (Saigo is warned that if the original timeline is restored, his wife's family will almost certainly die in the atomic bombing of Hiroshima). Sakamoto wounds Saigo before heading to the railway station where the assassination is supposed to occur. He is about to stop Inoue from killing An, but Saigo once again confronts him. Sakamoto kills Inoue, then guns down Saigo to prevent him from shooting An; An then assassinates Itō, as in the original timeline. Later, Sakamoto is seen planting explosives to destroy the temple stone, when Hye-rin walks up to him. It then becomes clear that she was a Korean researcher in the original timeline, who had followed Inoue when he traveled back in time. Although this Hye-rin (as opposed to the Hye-rin in the alternate timeline) and Sakamoto have never met, they immediately form a special bond.

Back in 2009, it becomes clear that the original timeline has been restored, and at the Independence Hall of Korea, a young boy Sakamoto had met in the alternate timeline sees numerous pictures of Korean heroes and leaders, including one of Sakamoto and Hye-rin together smiling.

Cast
 Jang Dong-gun as Masayuki Sakamoto, a JBI agent of Japanese and Korean descent
 Toru Nakamura as Shojiro Saigo, Sakamoto's partner
  as Oh Hye-rin, the female leader of the Korean terrorist group Hureisenjin
  as Yuriko Saigo, Shojiro's wife
 Shin Goo as Takahashi, Sakamoto's mentor
 Ken Mitsuishi as Hideyo, a JBI employee who wears large eyeglasses
 Shōhei Imamura as a historian
 Kim Min-sun as a kindergarten teacher who appears at the end of the film
 
 Nobuyuki Katsube
 Lee Sa-pi
 Woo Sang-jeon

Production
2009: Lost Memories was a co-production between Korea and Japan, coinciding with the 2002 FIFA World Cup, held jointly in Japan and South Korea.

Bok Geo-il, author of the source novel Bimyeong-eul Chajaseo ("Looking for an Epitaph") (1987), refused to be associated with the finished product, and successfully sued the film-makers to have his name removed from the credits.

Reception
According to Tom Vick, the theme of the film represents a desire in Korean cinema to "transcend time and memory" also reflected in other contemporary films such as Flower Island, Il Mare, and Bungee Jumping of Their Own.

Jonathan Clements in The Encyclopedia of Science Fiction wrote: 

The New York Times welcomed the film, saying that while the film is too long, the plot "leaps unexpectedly from action thriller to science-fiction drama without losing sight of the humanity beneath the nationalism."

See also

 History of Korea
 Korean reunification
 List of Korean-language films
 Cinema of Korea
 Contemporary culture of South Korea
 Time travel
 Alternate history

References

Nguyen, Duy Lap. "Alternate Histories of Korean National Sovereignty in 2009: Lost Memories." Science Fiction Studies Vol. 44, No. 3 (November 2017), pp. 546–562.

Notes

External links 
 
 
 
 2009 Lost Memories, review at Asian Cinema.
 Korea That Might Have Been: Seoul as a Large Japanese City (movie review) by Jeannette Catsoulis, The New York Times, May 20, 2005.
 Elley, Derek. 2009 -- Lost Memories (film review). Variety, July 9, 2002.
 Entry in The Encyclopedia of Science Fiction

2002 films
2002 action thriller films
2002 science fiction action films
ADV Films
South Korean alternate history films
Alternate timeline films
Anti-Japanese sentiment in Korea
2000s dystopian films
Films about terrorism in Asia
Films set in 2009
Films set in 1909
Films set in the future
Films set in Korea
2000s Japanese-language films
2000s Korean-language films
Political thriller films
South Korean action thriller films
South Korean science fiction action films
Films about time travel
Films about Japan–Korea relations
Japan in non-Japanese culture
2000s South Korean films
CJ Entertainment films